Generation X is the first studio album by English punk rock band Generation X, produced by Martin Rushent, it was released in the United Kingdom on 17 March 1978.

Production
Generation X was recorded at TW Studios in Fulham, West London, during November–December 1977, with the producer Martin Rushent and the engineer Alan Winstanley.

The band had previously worked with the producer Phil Wainman on prior singles, but had been dissatisfied with the results, critiquing his production as too "poppy" and polished, and sought a recorded sound for the album that resembled the band's live performances. Frontman Billy Idol suggested Rushent for the role as he had been impressed with his recent work with The Stranglers. Guitarist Derwood Andrews later recalled, "Martin Rushent told great jokes, but his engineer Alan Winstanley was more responsible for the sound of the album".

The album was recorded during one week, with many of the songs being completed in one take. Bassist Tony James wrote most of the lyrics, with Idol composing the music. Andrews and drummer Mark Laff finished the songs by adding instrumental parts.

"We (recorded) it in TW (Studios), and it was like recording in a garage, it was such a shithole. But it was great as we felt completely at home, we just plugged in and played great and it sounded great. ... 'Youth Youth Youth' was done in one take, we just set Derwood up with a wall of speakers in the studio, no headphones and just left the tape running. We were pissed, and did it at midnight, that's the only way we could have possibly recorded that track. He just went mad, we just all sat there in awe as he went crazy (playing that solo)." − Tony James

Charts
On commercial release in the United Kingdom in March 1978 the album reached #29 in the Albums Chart.

Single releases
The song "Ready Steady Go" was issued as a single in February 1978 prior to the album's release, peaking at #47 in the United Kingdom's Singles Chart.

Cover art
The band portrait used as the front cover was photographed by Gered Mankowitz.

Release formats
The original U.S. release of the album featured a variant track listing, omitting three songs and adding three songs from the band's singles releases, with the addition of a cover of John Lennon's "Gimme Some Truth".

The album was later remastered and reissued in 2002 with the original UK track listing, augmented by six bonus tracks from singles.

Two outtakes recorded during the TW Studios sessions for Generation X, "Your Generation" and "Rock On", were retrospectively commercially issued on the 2004 K.M.D - Sweet Revenge Xtra album.

The album was re-issued internationally on 26 April 2019 as a part of a 2-CD/3-LP Deluxe collector's set, re-mastered by its original engineer Alan Winstanley. The bonus CD/two bonus LPs featured a-side and b-sides tracks from singles, outtakes, and previously unreleased mixes.

Track listing

Original UK LP (1978)

Original US LP (1978)

Personnel 
Generation X
 Billy Idol − vocals
 Tony James − bass, vocals
 Bob "Derwood" Andrews − guitar, vocals
 Mark Laff − drums, vocals
Technical
Alan Winstanley - engineer
Gered Mankowitz - photography, design concept

Appearances in popular culture
The song "Kiss Me Deadly" was used in the soundtrack of the movie SLC Punk (1998).

References 

1978 debut albums
Generation X (band) albums
Chrysalis Records albums
Albums produced by Martin Rushent